EBF may refer to:
 EBF conference, an electronic procurement conference
 Encyclopædia Britannica Films
 English Border Front, the Shrewsbury Town hooligan firm.
 Epic Battle Fantasy, flash game series
 European Balloon Festival
 European Banking Federation
 European Baptist Federation
 European Bioanalysis Forum
 European Boxing Federation